Peckham Arch is a unique 35m span structure at the north end of Rye Lane in the London Borough of Southwark. The Arch was constructed in 1994 and was designed by architects Troughton McAslan as monument to and as instigator of regeneration in a borough which had suffered from years of decline. The Arch was the first of three capital projects around Peckham Square and was followed by construction of Peckham Library, completed in 2000. The Arch is home to a public art light sculpture conceived by the artist Ron Haselden.

In November 2016 it was announced that the Arch would be demolished to make way for new blocks of flats. A 2015 plan for the site included a total of 100 flats across nine sites surrounding the square, were the arch to be removed. Removal of the arch will allow for the construction of two new four and six-storey buildings, containing 19 flats, six of which will be social housing two of these will be within existing buildings at 91-93 Peckham High Street. Community campaigners have criticised the Southwark scheme for occupying and selling off rare covered public space for private development. The scheme has been further criticised for failing to demonstrate public support for removal of the Arch. Mature trees and green link connecting Rye Lane to Burgess Park is also to be lost if the Arch were to be demolished. Local architect Benedict O'Looney said it would be a "great tragedy" if the arch were removed, branding Southwark's proposal as "insane" and describing it as "an iconic symbol of Peckham".
In 2016 the London borough of Southwark turned down an application placed by 21 Southwark residents to list Peckham arch as an 'Asset of Community Value' https://www.southwark.gov.uk/assets/attach/5982/Unsuccessful-nominations-List-of-community-land-nominations-.xlsx
Planning permission for Southwark Council's proposal was granted in November 2016 and expired in November 2019.

References

Peckham
Buildings and structures in the London Borough of Southwark
Cultural infrastructure completed in 1994
Arches and vaults in England